Wojciech Witold Jaruzelski (6 July 1923 – 25 May 2014) was a Polish military general, politician and de facto leader of the Polish People's Republic from 1981 until 1989. He was the First Secretary of the Polish United Workers' Party between 1981 and 1989, making him the last leader of the Polish People's Republic. Jaruzelski served as Prime Minister from 1981 to 1985, the Chairman of the Council of State from 1985 to 1989 and briefly as President of Poland from 1989 to 1990, when the office of President was restored after 37 years. He was also the last commander-in-chief of the Polish People's Army, which in 1990 became the Polish Armed Forces. 
 
Born to Polish nobility in Kurów in eastern (then-central) Poland, Jaruzelski was deported with his family to Siberia by the NKVD after the invasion of Poland. Assigned to forced labour in the Siberian wilderness, he developed photokeratitis which forced him to wear protective sunglasses for the rest of his life. In 1943, Jaruzelski joined the newly created First Polish Army and fought alongside the Soviets against Nazi Germany in the Eastern Front, most notably in the liberation of Warsaw and in the Battle of Berlin. Following the Polish October and the expatriation of Marshal Konstantin Rokossovsky back to the Soviet Union, Jaruzelski became the chief political officer of the Polish People's Army and eventually Polish Minister of Defence in 1968.

Jaruzelski became the First Secretary of the Polish United Workers' Party and leader of Poland after the brief one-year term of Stanisław Kania. Kania's predecessor, Edward Gierek, left Poland severely indebted by accepting loans from foreign creditors and the country's economy almost collapsed by the time Jaruzelski became head of state. As Poland headed towards insolvency, rationing was enforced due to shortages of basic goods, which only contributed to the tense social and political situation. The declining living and working conditions triggered anger among the masses and strengthened anti-communist sentiment; the Solidarity union was also gaining support which worried the Polish Central Committee and the Soviet Union that viewed Solidarity as a threat to the Warsaw Pact. Fearing a Soviet intervention similar to those in Hungary (1956) and Czechoslovakia (1968), Jaruzelski imposed martial law in Poland on 13 December 1981 to crush the anti-communist opposition. The military junta, curfew and travel restrictions lasted until 22 July 1983.

By the mid-1980s, censorship lost its importance and the authority of the United Workers’ Party disintegrated, allowing more freedom of expression in Poland. During the revolutions of 1989 in Central and Eastern Europe, Jaruzelski supported the change of government for the benefit of the country and resigned after the Polish Round Table Agreement, which led to multi-party elections in Poland. He briefly served as President of Poland but exercised no real power and, in the 1990 Polish presidential election, Lech Wałęsa succeeded him as the first President elected in a popular vote. 

Jaruzelski remains a controversial figure in Poland today; he was praised for allowing the peaceful transition into democracy. However, he was fiercely criticized by contemporaries for instigating martial law, during which thousands of opposition activists were imprisoned without definite charges and other human rights violations.

Early life
Wojciech Witold Jaruzelski was born on 6 July 1923 in Kurów, into a family of Polish gentry.  He was the son of Wanda (née Zaremba) and Władysław Mieczysław Jaruzelski, a Czech-educated agronomist and volunteered soldier who fought in the war against Soviet Russia in 1920 and was raised on the family estate near Wysokie (in the vicinity of Białystok). From 1933 until September 1939, he was educated in a Catholic school in Warsaw where he received strict religious education.

World War II commenced on 1 September 1939 with the invasion of Poland by Germany, aided by the Soviet invasion of Poland sixteen days later. These resulted in the complete defeat of Poland by October and a partition between Soviet and German zones of control. Jaruzelski and his family fled to Lithuania to stay with some friends. However, a few months later, after Lithuania and the other Baltic states were forcibly incorporated into the Soviet Union, Jaruzelski and his family were captured by the Red Army and designated for deportation to Siberia.  

In June 1941, they were stripped of their valuable possessions and deported. At the railway station, Jaruzelski was separated from his father, who was sent directly to a gulag. Jaruzelski and his mother were sent on a month-long journey to Biysk, Altai Krai. During his labour work, he was stricken with snow blindness, suffering permanent damage to his eyes as well as to his back. His eye condition forced him to wear dark sunglasses most of the time for the rest of his life, which became his trademark. Jaruzelski's father died on 4 June 1942 from dysentery; his mother and sister survived the war (she died in 1966).

Military career

Jaruzelski was selected by the Soviet authorities for enrollment into the Soviet Officer Training School.  During his time in the Kazakh Republic, Jaruzelski wanted to join the non-Soviet controlled Polish exile army led by Władysław Anders, but in 1943, by which time the Soviet Union was fighting in Europe against Germany in the Eastern Front, he joined the Polish army units being formed under Soviet command. He served in this Soviet-controlled First Polish Army during the war. He participated in the 1945 Soviet military takeover of Warsaw and the Battle of Berlin. By the time the war ended that year, he had gained the rank of lieutenant.  He "further credited himself in Soviet eyes" by engaging in combat against the non-Communist Polish Home Army, from 1945 to 1947.

After the end of the war, Jaruzelski graduated from the Polish Higher Infantry School and then from the General Staff Academy.  He joined Poland's Communist party, the Polish United Workers' Party, in 1948 and became an informant for the Soviet supervised Main Directorate of Information of the Polish Army using the cover name Wolski.  In the initial post-war years, he was among those who fought the Polish anti-Communists ("cursed soldiers") in the Świętokrzyskie region. A BBC News profile of Jaruzelski states that his career "took off after the departure [from Poland] in 1956 of Polish-born Soviet Marshal, Konstantin Rokossovsky", who had been Poland's Commander in Chief and Minister of Defence.  Jaruzelski was elected to be a member of the Central Committee of the Polish United Workers' Party and became the Chief Political Officer of the Polish armed forces in 1960, its chief of staff in 1964; and Polish Minister of Defence in 1968, succeeding in the latter post Marshal Marian Spychalski persecuted in the years 1948-1956, albeit without the rank.

In August 1968, Jaruzelski, as the defence minister, ordered the 2nd Army under General Florian Siwicki (of the "LWP") to invade Czechoslovakia, resulting in military occupation of northern Czechoslovakia until 11 November 1968 when under his orders and agreements with the Soviet Union his Polish troops were withdrawn and replaced by the Soviet Army. In 1970, he was involved in the successful plot against Władysław Gomułka, which led to the appointment of Edward Gierek as General Secretary of the Polish United Workers Party. There is some question whether he took part in organising the brutal suppression of striking workers; or whether his orders to the Communist military led to massacres in the coastal cities of Gdańsk, Gdynia, Elbląg and Szczecin. As Minister of Defense, General Jaruzelski was ultimately responsible for 27,000 troops used against unarmed civilians. He claims that he was circumvented, which is why he never apologised for his involvement, but he could have resigned, especially after the resignation of foreign minister Adam Rapacki, but did not. Jaruzelski became a candidate member for the Politburo of the Polish United Workers' Party, the chief executive body of the party, obtaining full membership the following year.

Leader of the Polish military government 

On 11 February 1981, Jaruzelski was named Chairman of the Council of Ministers (Prime Minister).  On 18 October, Stanisław Kania was ousted as First Secretary of the Central Committee of the Polish United Workers' Party after a listening device recorded him criticising the Soviet leadership. Jaruzelski was elected his successor, becoming the only professional soldier to become the leader of a ruling European Communist party.

A fortnight after taking power, Jaruzelski met with Solidarity head Lech Wałęsa and Catholic bishop Józef Glemp, and hinted that he wanted to bring the church and the union into a sort of coalition government. However, his intention was to crush Solidarity. As early as September, while he was still merely prime minister, he met with his aides to find an excuse to impose martial law. On 13 December, citing purported recordings of Solidarity leaders planning a coup, Jaruzelski organised his own coup by proclaiming martial law.  A Military Council of National Salvation was formed, with Jaruzelski as chairman. A BBC News profile of Jaruzelski contends that the establishment of martial law was "an attempt to suppress the Solidarity movement."

According to Jaruzelski, martial law was necessary to avoid a Soviet invasion.  In a May 1992 interview with Der Spiegel, Jaruzelski said: "Given the strategic logic of the time, I probably would have acted the same way if I had been a Soviet general. At that time, Soviet political and strategic interests were threatened."  However, at a press conference in September 1997 Viktor Kulikov, former supreme commander of Warsaw Pact forces, denied that the Soviet Union had either threatened or intended to intervene. According to Politburo minutes from 10 December 1981, Yuri Andropov stated "We do not intend to introduce troops into Poland. That is the proper position, and we must adhere to it until the end. I don't know how things will turn out in Poland, but even if Poland falls under the control of Solidarity, that's the way it will be."

Jaruzelski also claimed in 1997 that Washington had given him a "green light", stating that he had sent Eugeniusz Molczyk to confer with Vice-President George H. W. Bush, who had agreed with Molczyk that martial law was the lesser of two evils.  Whether this meeting with the American vice-president occurred is disputed. While it is erroneously cited, Harvard historian Mark Kramer has pointed out that no documents support Jaruzelski's claim.

Jaruzelski was chiefly responsible for the imposition of martial law in Poland on 13 December 1981 in an attempt to crush the pro-democracy movements, which included Solidarity, the first non-Communist trade union in Warsaw Pact history. Subsequent years saw his government and its internal security forces censor, persecute, and jail thousands of journalists and opposition activists without charge; few lost their lives in the first days of the introduction of martial law. The socio-economic crisis deepened even more than in the late 1970s and rationing of basic foods such as sugar, milk, and meat, as well as materials such as gasoline and consumer products, continued while the median income of the population fell by as much as 10 percent. During Jaruzelski's rule from 1981 to 1989, between 100,000 and 300,000 people left the country.

Historical evidence released under Russian President Boris Yeltsin indicates that the Soviet Union did not plan to invade Poland. In fact, Jaruzelski actually tried to persuade the Soviets to invade in order to support martial law, only to be sternly turned down. This left the Solidarity "problem" to be sorted out by the Polish government (see also Soviet reaction to the Polish crisis of 1980–1981). However, the exact plans of the Soviet Union at that time have never been determined. Jaruzelski, however, justified cracking down by alleging that the threat of Soviet intervention was quite likely had he not dealt with Solidarity internally. This question, as well as many other facts about Poland in the years 1945–1989, are presently under the investigation of government historians at the Instytut Pamięci Narodowej (IPN), whose publications reveal facts from the Communist-era archives. Additionally, there are numerous confirmations from Czech army officers of the time speaking of Operation Krkonoše, a plan for an armed invasion of Poland, because of which many units of the Czechoslovak People's Army were stationed on highest alert, ready for deployment within hours.

In 1982, Jaruzelski helped reorganise the Front of National Unity, the organisation the Communists used to manage their satellite parties, as the Patriotic Movement for National Rebirth.

In 1985, Jaruzelski resigned as prime minister and defence minister and became the Chairman of the Polish Council of State, a post equivalent to that of the head of state of Poland. However, his power centered on and firmly entrenched in his coterie of "LWP" generals and lower ranks officers of the Polish Communist Army. There were plans in the government circles to award him the rank of Marshal of Poland, ultimately abandoned largely due to his own negative attitude towards the proposal.

Presidency 

The policies of Mikhail Gorbachev stimulated political reform in Poland as well as in other communist countries in Central and Eastern Europe.

From 6 February to 15 April 1989, negotiations were held between 13 working groups during 94 sessions of the roundtable talks. These negotiations "radically altered the shape "of the Polish government and society", and resulted in an agreement which stated that a great degree of political power would be given to a newly created bicameral legislature. It also restored a post of president to act as head of state and chief executive. Solidarity was also declared a legal organisation. During the ensuing partially-free elections, the Communists and their allies were allocated 65 percent of the seats in the Sejm. Solidarity won all the remaining elected seats, and 99 out of the 100 seats in the fully elected Senate were also won by Solidarity-backed candidates. Amid such a crushing defeat, there were fears Jaruzelski would annul the results.  However, he allowed them to stand. Jaruzelski was elected by parliament to the position of president. He was the only candidate.

Jaruzelski was unsuccessful in convincing Lech Wałęsa to include Solidarity in a "grand coalition" with the Communists. He resigned as first secretary of the PZPR on 29 July 1989. Mieczysław Rakowski succeeded him as party leader.

The Communists initially intended to give Solidarity a few token cabinet posts for the sake of appearances.  However,  Wałęsa persuaded the Communists' two allied parties, the United People's Party (ZSL) and the Alliance of Democrats (SD), to break their alliance with the PZPR. Accepting that he would have to appoint a Solidarity member as prime minister, Jaruzelski then asked Wałęsa to select three candidates, one of whom he would ask to form a government. Ultimately, Tadeusz Mazowiecki, who had helped organise the roundtable talks, was selected as first non-Communist prime minister of an Eastern Bloc country in four decades. Jaruzelski resigned as president in 1990. He was succeeded by Wałęsa, who had won the presidential election on 9 December.

On 31 January 1991, Jaruzelski retired from the army.

After retirement

In October 1994, while attending a book-selling activity in Wroclaw, Jaruzelski was attacked by a male pensioner with a stone; his jaw was injured, requiring surgery. The attacker, who had been imprisoned during the martial law period, was sentenced to two years' imprisonment and fined 2,000,000 zloty.

In an interview in 2001, Jaruzelski said that he believed Communism failed and that he was now a social democrat.  He also announced his support for President Aleksander Kwaśniewski and Leszek Miller, later Prime Minister. Both Kwaśniewski and Miller were members of the Democratic Left Alliance, the social democratic party that included most of the remains of the PUWP.

In May 2005, Russian President Vladimir Putin awarded a medal commemorating the 60th anniversary of victory over Nazi Germany to Jaruzelski and other former leaders, including former Romanian King Michael I. Czech President Václav Klaus criticised this step, saying that Jaruzelski was a symbol of the Warsaw Pact invasion of Czechoslovakia in 1968. Jaruzelski said that he had apologised and that the decision on the August 1968 invasion had been a great "political and moral mistake".

On 28 March 2006, Jaruzelski was awarded a Siberian Exiles Cross by Polish President Lech Kaczyński. However, after making this fact public, Kaczyński said that this was a mistake and blamed bureaucrats for giving him a document containing 1,293 names without notifying him of Jaruzelski's inclusion. After this statement, Jaruzelski returned the cross.

On 31 March 2006, the IPN charged Jaruzelski with committing Communist crimes, mainly the creation of a criminal military organisation with the aim of carrying out criminal acts—mostly concerned with the illegal imprisonment of people. A second charge involved inciting state ministers to commit acts beyond their competence. Jaruzelski evaded most court appearances, citing poor health. In December 2010, Jaruzelski suffered from severe pneumonia and, in March 2011, he was diagnosed with lymphoma.

Death

Jaruzelski died on 25 May 2014 in a Warsaw hospital after suffering a stroke earlier that month. He had reportedly requested last rites by a Catholic priest. President Bronisław Komorowski, former Presidents Lech Wałęsa and Aleksander Kwaśniewski, and hundreds of other Poles attended his funeral mass at the Field Cathedral of the Polish Army in Warsaw on 30 May. Wałęsa and Komorowski, who were among the thousands imprisoned during the crackdown on Solidarity in 1981, both said that judgment against Jaruzelski "would be left to God". Jaruzelski was cremated and buried with full military honours at Powązki Military Cemetery in Warsaw, near the grave of Bolesław Bierut, the first Communist leader of Poland after World War II. The decision to bury Jaruzelski at Powązki, the burial place of Polish soldiers killed defending their country since the early 19th century, caused protests.

Personal life
Jaruzelski married Barbara Halina Jaruzelska (1931–2017) in 1961. They had a daughter, Monika who was born on 11 August 1963. Monika has a son, Gustaw.

In 2014, his wife Barbara threatened to file for divorce, saying she had caught his nurse Dorota in a compromising position with him.

Legacy
The BBC reported in 2001 that "for some Poles — particularly the Solidarity generation — he is little short of a traitor", even comparing his philosophy of "a strong Poland within a Soviet-dominated bloc" to Vidkun Quisling's philosophy of a similar status for Norway within the Nazi-controlled hemisphere. Meanwhile, opinion polls as of 15 May 2001 suggested that a majority of the Polish people were open to agreeing with his explanation that martial law was implemented to forestall a Soviet invasion. Available documents indicate that Jaruzelski actually lobbied for Soviet intervention. In interviews in Russian media (Rossiyskaya Gazeta, for example), he has been presented as the harbinger of Poland's democracy.

Croatian writer Slavenka Drakulić described Jaruzelski as a "tragic believer in Communism who made a pact with the devil in good faith".

Written works 
Różnić się mądrze (English translation: To Differ Wisely; 1999).

"Być może to ostatnie słowo (wyjaśnienia złożone przed Sądem)" (English translation: "It may be the last word (explanations given in the Court)"; 2008).

Honours and awards

Poland

Soviet Union

Other countries

References

Bibliography
Berger, Manfred E. Jaruzelski: Traitor or Patriot? London: Hutchinson, 1990.  
Berger, Manfred E., and Zbigniew Bauer. Jaruzelski. Kraków: Oficyna Cracovia, 1991. 
Labedz, Leopold. Poland Under Jaruzelski: A Comprehensive Sourcebook on Poland During and After Martial Law. New York: Scribner, 1984. 
Pelinka, Anton. Politics of the Lesser Evil: Leadership, Democracy, & Jaruzelski's Poland. New Brunswick, NJ: Transaction Publishers, 1999. 
Swidlicki, Andrzej. Political Trials in Poland, 1981–1986. London: Croom Helm, 1988.  
Weschler, Lawrence. The Passion of Poland, from Solidarity Through the State of War. New York: Pantheon Books, 1982.  
, "Jaruzelski, the Shaker of Polish History" Beijing, Shijiezhishi, 2016

External links

Jaruzelski: Selected Speeches
Marek Jan Chodakiewicz (12 December 2006), The Jaruzelski Case: The Ascent of Agent 'Wolski', World Politics Review

1923 births
2014 deaths
People from Puławy County
People from Lublin Voivodeship (1919–1939)
Clan of Ślepowron
Members of the Politburo of the Polish United Workers' Party
Polish Roman Catholics
Converts to Roman Catholicism from atheism or agnosticism
Heads of state of the Polish People's Republic
Polish People's Army generals
Presidents of Poland
Polish military personnel of World War II
Prime Ministers of the Polish People's Republic
Collaborators with the Soviet Union
Recipients of the Silver Cross of the Virtuti Militari
Recipients of the Virtuti Militari (1943–1989)
Officers of the Order of Polonia Restituta
Knights of the Order of Polonia Restituta
Recipients of the Order of the Cross of Grunwald, 3rd class
Recipients of the Order of Polonia Restituta (1944–1989)
Recipients of the Order of the Builders of People's Poland
Recipients of the Order of the Banner of Work
Recipients of the Cross of Valour (Poland)
Recipients of the Silver Cross of Merit (Poland)
Recipients of the Order of Lenin
Recipients of the Order of the Red Banner
Recipients of the Order of Friendship of Peoples
Collars of the Order of the White Lion
Commanders of the Order of the Crown (Belgium)
Commandeurs of the Légion d'honneur
Grand Crosses of the Order of Prince Henry
Recipients of the Medal of Zhukov
Knights Grand Cross with Collar of the Order of Merit of the Italian Republic
Recipients of the Order of Georgi Dimitrov
Recipients of the Pro Memoria Medal
Recipients of the Scharnhorst Order
Members of the Polish Sejm 1961–1965
Members of the Polish Sejm 1969–1972
Members of the Polish Sejm 1972–1976
Members of the Polish Sejm 1976–1980
Members of the Polish Sejm 1980–1985
Burials at Powązki Military Cemetery
People of the Cold War
Heads of government who were later imprisoned